Titchener is a surname. Notable people with the surname include:

 Edward B. Titchener (1867–1927) British/American psychologist
 who popularized the Ebbinghaus optical illusion (also known as Titchener circles)
 Louise Titchener (born 1941), American novelist
 Paul Titchener (born 1941), New Zealand author and local body politician
 for Miss Titchener, see Titchener v British Rlys Board - a Scottish delict case